Tom Scott is an American sound engineer. He has won two Academy Awards for Best Sound. From 1985 to 1992, he was the chief engineer of Skywalker Sound.

Selected filmography
 The Right Stuff (1983)
 Amadeus (1984)

References

External links

Year of birth missing (living people)
Living people
American audio engineers
Place of birth missing (living people)
Best Sound Mixing Academy Award winners